Paolo Gallina is a Canadian politician, who was elected to the Legislative Assembly of Yukon in the 2016 election. He represented the electoral district of Porter Creek Centre as a member of the Yukon Liberal Party until his defeat in the 2021 Yukon general election.

Gallina has a background in tourism, sport management and community investment. Prior to entering territorial politics, he was the Community Investment Manager at Northwestel. He also served as Marketing Manager for the 2007 Canada Winter Games in Whitehorse and promoted Yukon culture and tourism at Canada's Northern House during the Winter Olympics in Vancouver in 2010.

Gallina was elected as MLA of Porter Creek Centre on November 7, 2016, as part of the election of a Liberal majority government in the Yukon. Gallina is currently a member of the Standing Committee on Public Accounts, the Standing Committee on Rules, Elections and Privileges, and the Standing Committee on Appointments to Major Government Boards and Committees.

Electoral record

Yukon general election, 2016

|-

| Liberal
| Paolo Gallina
| align="right"| 452
| align="right"| 43.3%
| align="right"| +11.7%

| NDP
| Pat Berrel
| align="right"| 213
| align="right"| 20.4%
| align="right"| -9.3%

|-
! align=left colspan=3|Total
! align=right| 1044
! align=right| 100.0%
! align=right|
|}

References

Yukon Liberal Party MLAs
Living people
Politicians from Whitehorse
21st-century Canadian politicians
Year of birth missing (living people)